Ahmed Yacoub Mohammed Abu Halawa (born 1 January 1985) is a Jordanian footballer of Palestinian origin who plays as a defender for Shabab Al-Aqaba.

Honours

Al-Wehdat
Jordan Premier League (1): 2010–11
Jordan FA Cup (1): 2010–11
Jordan Super Cup (1): 2011

Al-Yarmouk
Jordan FA Shield (1): 2006

References

External links 

1985 births
Living people
Jordanian footballers
Jordanian people of Palestinian descent
Al-Wehdat SC players
Association football defenders
Sportspeople from Amman
Jordanian expatriate footballers
Jordanian expatriate sportspeople in Oman
Expatriate footballers in Oman
Jordanian expatriate sportspeople in the State of Palestine
Expatriate footballers in the State of Palestine
Al-Yarmouk FC (Jordan) players
Markaz Shabab Al-Am'ari players
That Ras Club players
Sohar SC players
Muscat Club players
Al-Ahli SC (Amman) players
Shabab Al-Aqaba Club players
Jordanian Pro League players
West Bank Premier League players
Oman Professional League players